{|

{{Infobox ship career
|Hide header=
|Ship country=United States
|Ship flag= 
|Ship name= * "LST-1143Daedalus|Ship namesake= Daedalus
|Ship ordered= as a Type S3-M-K2 hull
|Ship builder= Chicago Bridge & Iron Company, Seneca, Illinois
|Ship laid down= 31 January 1945
|Ship launched= 27 April 1945
|Ship acquired=
|Ship commissioned=* 9 May 1945 (reduced)
19 October 1945 (full)
|Ship decommissioned= *21 May 1945
23 October 1947
|Ship in service=
|Ship out of service=
|Ship reclassified= ARL-41
|Ship refit= converted to Landing Craft Repair Ship
|Ship struck=  
|Ship reinstated=
|Ship homeport=
|Ship identification=*Hull symbol: LST-1143
Hull symbol: ARL-35
|Ship fate= *Laid up in the Atlantic Reserve Fleet, Green Cove Springs Group
Sold, 28 October 1960
|Ship notes=
}}

|}

USS Daedalus (ARL-35) was one of 39 Achelous-class landing craft repair ships built for the United States Navy during World War II. Named for Daedalus (in Greek mythology, an exiled Athenian who served in the courts of Minos and Kokalos, regarded as representative of artists and artisans of the later Minoan or Mykenaian age; imprisoned by Minos, he made wings to escape), she was the only U.S. Naval vessel to bear the name.

Construction
Laid down as LST-1143 at Chicago Bridge and Iron Company, Seneca, Illinois; redesignated landing craft repair ship ARL-35 14 August 1944; launched 27 April 1945; sponsored by Mrs. D. Steinmann; placed in partial commission 9 May 1945; sailed to Mobile, Alabama, where she was decommissioned 21 May, for conversion to a landing craft repair ship; and commissioned in full 19 October 1945.

Service historyDaedalus departed Mobile 3 December 1945, and arrived at Norfolk, Virginia, six days later. She provided repair services to the fleet at Norfolk, Guantanamo Bay, and Newport, Rhode Island, until arriving at Charleston, South Carolina, 1 July 1947, for overhaul. Later towed to Green Cove Springs, Florida, she was placed out of commission in reserve there 23 October 1947. Struck from the Naval Vessel Register (date unknown), she was sold 28 October 1960, to the Norfolk, Baltimore and Caroline Line for commercial service and renamed Virginia Clipper''. The ship was resold in 1978, to Thor Corporation of Venezuela; her final fate is unknown.

References

Bibliography 

Online resources

External links
 

 

Achelous-class repair ships
Achelous-class repair ships converted from LST-542-class ships
World War II auxiliary ships of the United States
Ships built in Seneca, Illinois
1945 ships